Banjar Assembly constituency is one of the 68 constituencies in the Himachal Pradesh Legislative Assembly of Himachal Pradesh a northern state of India. Banjar is also part of Mandi Lok Sabha constituency.

Members of Legislative Assembly
 1967 to 1977: Dileram Shabab ( Indian National Congress)
 2017 to 2022: Surender shourie (Bharatiya janata party) 
 (2022–Present) : Surender shourie (Bharatiya janata party)

Election candidate

2022

Election results

2017

See also
 Kullu district
 List of constituencies of Himachal Pradesh Legislative Assembly

References

External links
 

Assembly constituencies of Himachal Pradesh
Kullu district